Dave B. Mitchell is an American voice actor, who is best known as the current voice of Knuckles the Echidna in the Sonic the Hedgehog franchise, since 2019.

Career
Since beginning his professional voiceover career in 1997, his voice has appeared in hundreds of projects in film, television, animation, video games, audiobooks and on the Internet. He co-starred on Comedy Central's Lil' Bush and was heard as the announcer in California Milk Advisory Board's series of "Happy Cows" commercials.

In 2019, he became the current voice of Knuckles the Echidna in the Sonic the Hedgehog franchise, beginning with Team Sonic Racing.

He is a member of SAG-AFTRA and the American Society of Composers, Authors, and Publishers (ASCAP). He is represented by Dean Panaro Talent in Los Angeles, where he currently resides.

Filmography

Animation

Anime

Live action

Film

Video games

References

External links 
 Official Website
 
 
 Dave B. Mitchell at MySpace
 Lil' Bush Official Website
 Looking for Group: Slaughter the World at YouTube

Living people
American male video game actors
American male voice actors
Place of birth missing (living people)
20th-century American male actors
21st-century American male actors
Year of birth missing (living people)